Fanano is a comune (municipality) in the Province of Modena in the Italian region Emilia-Romagna, located about  southwest of Bologna and about  south of Modena.

Fanano borders the following municipalities: Cutigliano, Fiumalbo, Lizzano in Belvedere, Montese, San Marcello Piteglio, Sestola.

It is located in the Modenese Apennines. The Monte Cimone is in its territory.

Main sights
Watch tower
San Silvestro, a Baroque church
San Colombano, another church
Oratorio della Beata Vergine delle Grazie
Santa Chiara
San Francesco
San Giuseppe Sposo di Maria
Santa Chiara

People
 Italo Bortolotti, painter
 Felix Pedro, born in the small village of Trignano, part of the comune of Fanano.

Sister cities
 Fairbanks,  United States

References

External links
 Official website

Cities and towns in Emilia-Romagna